Tye is a city in Taylor County, Texas, United States. The population was 1,242 at the 2010 census. It is part of the Abilene, Texas Metropolitan Statistical Area.

Geography

Tye is located at  (32.453324, –99.866993).

According to the United States Census Bureau, the city has a total area of 4.7 square miles (12.1 km), all land.

City History
About 1900 the T & P Railroad held a contest to select a name for one of the communities along its route. The town name chosen was Tye. It is in honor of John P. Tye, a Methodist minister who happened to be the first postmaster of the town. Before 1900 the town name had been  Tebo.

Climate
The climate in this area is characterized by hot, humid summers and generally mild to cool winters.  According to the Köppen Climate Classification system, Tye has a humid subtropical climate, abbreviated "Cfa" on climate maps.

Demographics

2020 census

As of the 2020 United States census, there were 1,176 people, 415 households, and 319 families residing in the city.

2000 census
As of the census of 2000, there were 1,158 people, 426 households, and 316 families residing in the city. The population density was 248.3 people per square mile (95.9/km). There were 582 housing units at an average density of 124.8/sq mi (48.2/km). The racial makeup of the city was 90.67% White, 1.81% African American, 0.60% Native American, 0.69% Asian, 5.27% from other races, and 0.95% from two or more races. Hispanic or Latino of any race were 11.40% of the population.

There were 426 households, out of which 38.3% had children under the age of 18 living with them, 56.3% were married couples living together, 13.4% had a female householder with no husband present, and 25.8% were non-families. 21.8% of all households were made up of individuals, and 7.7% had someone living alone who was 65 years of age or older. The average household size was 2.72 and the average family size was 3.17.

In the city, the population was spread out, with 30.7% under the age of 18, 8.9% from 18 to 24, 28.8% from 25 to 44, 22.4% from 45 to 64, and 9.2% who were 65 years of age or older. The median age was 33 years. For every 100 females, there were 91.1 males. For every 100 females age 18 and over, there were 88.1 males.

The median income for a household in the city was $25,568, and the median income for a family was $31,719. Males had a median income of $25,263 versus $19,000 for females. The per capita income for the city was $11,508. About 23.2% of families and 26.1% of the population were below the poverty line, including 39.6% of those under age 18 and 12.1% of those age 65 or over.

Education
The City of Tye is served by the Merkel Independent School District.

References

Cities in Taylor County, Texas
Cities in Texas
Cities in the Abilene metropolitan area